On a Bench in a Park (Swedish: På en bänk i en park) is a 1960 Swedish thriller film written and directed by Hasse Ekman.  He also stars, together with Sigge Fürst, Bengt Ekerot and Lena Granhagen. The film's sets were designed by the art director P.A. Lundgren. It was shot at the Råsunda Studios in Stockholm and on location around the city including at the Central Station and Vasa Theatre.

Plot
Sam Persson, previously worked as a musician but has resided for several years in a mental hospital. When he is discharged he reads in the newspaper that his childhood friend Stig Brender has become a big name in the theatre.

Persson has gotten the idea that it is Brender who is the cause of all accidents occurring to him. Persson finds Brender at the Royal Theatre one evening and tries to kill him with a hammer, instead Persson himself falls dead to the floor. Brender avoids calling the police, being scared to become a suspect, instead he places the corpse on a bench in a park.

Cast
Hasse Ekman as Stig Brender, theatre manager 
Sigge Fürst as Envall, Police Inspector
Bengt Ekerot as Sam Persson
Lena Granhagen as Lena Vendel, Stig Brenders wife
Ragnar Arvedson as Axel Forselius, actor
Torsten Lilliecrona as Theater Director 
Olof Sandborg as Strandmark 
Fylgia Zadig as Mrs. Conelli 
Yngve Nordwall as Fris, Senior Lecturer 
Gertrud Danielsson as Mrs. Johansson 
John Norrman as Piss-Oskar 
Manne Grünberger as Mr. Victorin
Eric Stolpe as Peddler 
Allan Edwall as Man at Restaurant 
Gunnar Olsson as Gustaf Andreas Wallin, Vicar 
Claes Esphagen as Dahlman
Folke Asplund as Nicke
Åke Wästersjö as Nicklasson
Marrit Ohlsson as Luggage Expedition Lady
Svea Holst as Luggage Expedition Lady
Astrid Bodin as Berglärkan
Kaj Nohrborg as Mac Norling
Ragnar Klange as an actor
Gösta Krantz as Sten
 Georg Skarstedt as 	Drunk at the Street

References

Bibliography 
 Gustafsson, Fredrik. The Man from the Third Row: Hasse Ekman, Swedish Cinema and the Long Shadow of Ingmar Bergman. Berghahn Books, 2016.
 Qvist, Per Olov & von Bagh, Peter. Guide to the Cinema of Sweden and Finland. Greenwood Publishing Group, 2000.

External links

1960 films
Films directed by Hasse Ekman
1960s thriller films
Swedish thriller drama films
1960s Swedish-language films
Films scored by Erik Nordgren
Films set in Stockholm
Films shot in Stockholm
1960s Swedish films